Glyphoturris is a genus of sea snails, marine gastropod mollusks in the family Mangeliidae.

Species
Species within the genus Glyphoturris include:
 Glyphoturris eritima (Bush, 1885)
 † Glyphoturris lampra Woodring 1928 
 Glyphoturris quadrata (Reeve, 1845)
 Glyphoturris rugirima (Dall, 1889)
Species brought into synonymy
 Glyphoturris diminuta (Adams C. B., 1850): synonym of Glyphoturris quadrata (Reeve, 1845)
 Glyphoturris granilirata (Smith, E.A., 1888): synonym of Pseudorhaphitoma granilirata (E. A. Smith, 1888)

References

 Worldwide Mollusc Species Data Base: Mangeliidae

External links
 Todd, Jonathan A. "Systematic list of gastropods in the Panama Paleontology Project collections." Budd and Foster 2006 (1996)
 Bouchet, P.; Kantor, Y. I.; Sysoev, A.; Puillandre, N. (2011). A new operational classification of the Conoidea. Journal of Molluscan Studies. 77, 273-308
  Tucker, J.K. 2004 Catalog of recent and fossil turrids (Mollusca: Gastropoda). Zootaxa 682:1-1295.

 
Gastropod genera